Lul Krag (7 February 1878 – 9 July 1956) was a Norwegian painter. She is best known for her landscape paintings from Rosendal.

Biography
She was born in Kongsberg, a daughter of Colonel Ole Krag (1837–1916)  and Elise Theodora Collett (1844–1926).   Krag  first began painting at the age of 20 as a student of Harriet Backer. She studied with Christian Krohg at the Académie Colarossi. In 1933 she moved to Rosendal. She lived a secluded life and did not exhibit her work. In 1954 she moved to Oslo, where she died two years later.

She is represented at the National Gallery of Norway with the charcoal drawings Løvtrær og kirke, Blomster i parken, and Fjell med bre.

References

1878 births
1956 deaths
People from Kongsberg
19th-century Norwegian painters
19th-century male artists
20th-century Norwegian painters